Argentré-du-Plessis (Gallo: Arjantrae) is a commune in the Ille-et-Vilaine department in Brittany in northwestern France.

Population

Inhabitants of Argentré-du-Plessis are called Argentréens in French.

Sights
The Château du Plessis is a local chateau with some vestiges of 16th-century construction, although it was largely rebuilt in the 19th century.

The church of Notre-Dame was built between 1775 and 1779.

The archaeological excavation at Bois du Pinel has uncovered fortifications dating from the 11th century, including a moat, two courtyards, and two enclosures.

See also
Communes of the Ille-et-Vilaine department

References

External links

  
 
 Mayors of Ille-et-Vilaine Association (amf35.asso.fr) 

Communes of Ille-et-Vilaine